Sachi Tamashiro (born April 28, 1980 in Mexico City, Mexico) is a Mexican telenovela actress.

Early life 
Sachi Tamashiro was born on April 28, 1980 in Mexico City, to a father of Japanese origin and a Mexican mother. Initially she worked in international trade in New Zealand. She studied in the Centro de Educación Artística of Televisa.

Career 
She participated in the telenovelas Cuando me enamoro, Ni contigo ni sin ti and Un refugio para el amor. She played July Barbosa in La Mujer del Vendaval.

In 2016, she starred in the telenovela Tres veces Ana as Maribel. She currently stars in the telenovela Enamorándome de Ramón.

Filmography

Awards and nominations

References

External links 
 

1980 births
Living people
Mexican telenovela actresses
Actresses from Mexico City
Mexican people of Japanese descent
Actresses of Japanese descent